Tryzub is a  far-right Ukrainian paramilitary organisation founded in 1993 by the Congress of Ukrainian Nationalists. Its full name is the Stepan Bandera All-Ukrainian Organization ″Tryzub″ and its main goal is to create the Ukrainian United Independent State. According to Tryzub, its enemies in achieving this goal are ″imperialism and chauvinism, fascism and communism, cosmopolitanism and pseudo-nationalism, totalitarianism and anarchy, any evil that seeks to parasitize on the sweat and blood of Ukrainians″.

History 
Created October 1993 by the Congress of Ukrainian Nationalists, Tryzub's leader since 2005 is Dmytro Yarosh. Among other important figures one names Ternopil's Officer Union member Eugene Fil (Євген Філь) and Ivan Suta (Іван Сута). Dmytro Yarosh himself pointed out the presence educated theorists members as well and he named the figures of Serhiy Kvit (Сергій Квіт) and Peter Ivanishin.

Tryzub became the basis for the formation of the Right Sector, and Dmytro Yarosh became the leader of the new right-wing coalition. As of 5 February 2014, the Investigative Committee of Russia claimed to have issued an international arrest warrant for Dmytro Yarosh.

Name and symbols 
The name ″Tryzub″ (″Тризуб″) is the name of the coat of arms of Ukraine where the front shape resembles a trident. While in Ukrainian there is the special term ″тризубець″ (tryzubetsʹ) for a trident per se, the shape on the coat of arms is specifically called by a derivative term "тризуб". The difference between ″тризубець″ and "тризуб" is not fully translatable in English yet resemble a bit the one between a trident and a trishula. While the first is more casual, the second is more heavily connected with symbolism.

The organization logo consists by the official description of "the Christ sword and the trysub, like the one of the Organization of Ukrainian Nationalists".

References

Anti-communism in Ukraine
Euromaidan
Far-right politics in Ukraine
Political organizations based in Ukraine
Anti-communist organizations
Paramilitary forces of Ukraine